The 1995 elections to West Dunbartonshire Council were held on the 6 April 1995 and were the first for the newly formed unitary authority, which was created under the Local Government etc (Scotland) Act 1994 and replaced the previous two-tier system of local government under Strathclyde Regional Council and Dumbarton and Clydebank District Councils.

Election results

Ward results

Changes before next election
A by-election was held in the Old Kilpatrick ward on 28 November 1996 to replace Independent Councillor Bill Kemp, who resigned in protest at the way the council was being run.

A by-election was held on 13 August 1998 to replace the deceased Provost, Patrick O'Neill.

References

External links

1995 Scottish local elections
1995
20th century in West Dunbartonshire